Dr. András Cser-Palkovics (born 25 September 1974) is a Hungarian politician, member of the National Assembly (MP) for Székesfehérvár (Fejér County Constituency I) between 2010 and 2014. He was a Member of the Parliament from Fejér County Regional List between 2006 and 2010. He is the current Mayor of Székesfehérvár since October 2010.

Personal life
He is married. His wife is Edina Cser-Palkovics. They have a daughter, Emma and two sons, Zalán and Ágoston.

References

External link

1974 births
Living people
Fidesz politicians
Members of the National Assembly of Hungary (2006–2010)
Members of the National Assembly of Hungary (2010–2014)
Mayors of places in Hungary
People from Székesfehérvár